The list of shipwrecks in 1898 includes ships sunk, foundered, grounded, or otherwise lost during 1898.

January

4 January

7 January

8 January

9 January

12 January

17 January

19 January

20 January

22 January

23 January

24 January

25 January

26 January

29 January

31 January

Unknown date

February

1 February

2 February

5 February

6 February

9 February

10 February

15 February

16 February

17 February

19 February

23 February

28 February

Unknown date

March

1 March

3 March

4 March

8 March

9 March

11 March

13 March

15 March

19 March

24 March

25 March

27 March

29 March

30 March

31 March

Unknown date

April

2 April

4 April

6 April

7 April

8 April

9 April

11 April

12 April

13 April

15 April

17 April

22 April

23 April

25 April

27 April

28 April

29 April

May

1 May

5 May

7 May

8 May

10 May

18 May

20 May

22 May

26 May

27 May

29 May

30 May

Unknown date

June

2 June

3 June

4 June

6 June

9 June

15 June

17 June

18 June

19 June

20 June

21 June

22 June

25 June

28 June

29 June

30 June

Unknown date

July

2 July

3 July

4 July

5 July

8 July

9 July

10 July

12 July

13 July

15 July

16 July

17 July

18 July

20 July

21 July

23 July

24 July

26 July

27 July

28 July

29 July

30 July

31 July

August

1 August

2 August

3 August

4 August

7 August

8 August

10 August

11 August

12 August

14 August

16 August

17 August

19 August

20 August

22 August

23 August

24 August

26 August

28 August

30 August

31 August

Unknown date

September

3 September

5 September

7 September

11 September

13 September

16 September

17 September

18 September

19 September

20 September

21 September

22 September

24 September

26 September

27 September

Unknown date

October

1 October

2 October

3 October

4 October

7 October

11 October

12 October

13 October

14 October

15 October

16 October

17 October

18 October

20 October

21 October

22 October

24 October

25 October

26 October

27 October

28 October

29 October

30 October

31 October

Unknown date

November

1 November

2 November

3 November

4 November

5 November

6 November

7 November

9 November

10 November

12 November

14 November

16 November

17 November

18 November

19 November

20 November

22 November

23 November

25 November

26 November

27 November

December

3 December

5 December

6 December

7 December

8 December

9 December

10 December

11 December

12 December

13 December

14 December

15 December

17 December

21 December

22 December

23 December

24 December

25 December

26 December

28 December

29 December

31 December

Unknown date

Unknown date

References
 

1898